VolksWorld is a monthly magazine about air-cooled Volkswagen vehicles published by Kelsey Media. The current editor is Paul Knight.

History and profile
VolksWorld was started in October 1987. The founding editor of the magazine was Keith Seume, author of The Beetle, a book about the Volkswagen Beetle. The magazine is headquartered in Kent.

Kelsey Media acquired VolksWorld from IPC Mediain March 2016.

References

External links

Automobile magazines published in the United Kingdom
Monthly magazines published in the United Kingdom
English-language magazines
Magazines established in 1987
1987 establishments in the United Kingdom
Mass media in Kent